Mohammad Mustafa is a Palestinian economist and chairman of the board of directors of the Palestine Investment Fund (PIF), as well as senior economic advisor to President Mahmoud Abbas. 

Previously, Mustafa served as Deputy Prime Minister of Palestine (Governments #15 & 16, 2013-2014) and as Minister of National Economy of Palestine (Government #16, 2014).

Mustafa has extensive international experience with government, global institutions, and academia, having spent over 15 years in senior positions across different sectors at the World Bank Group in Washington, D.C. As a prominent expert on investment and economic affairs, Mustafa spent two years as economic advisor to the Government of Kuwait on economic reform and two years as advisor to the Public Investment Fund in the Kingdom of Saudi Arabia. 

Mustafa also taught as a visiting professor at his alma mater, The George Washington University.

Career
Currently, Mustafa is the chairman of the Palestine Investment Fund. Between 2006 and 2013, Mustafa was also the chief executive officer (CEO) of the PIF. Under his leadership, the PIF has become the premier investor in Palestine, having completed c. 60 investments, incentivized $1.2 billion in foreign investment, which has provided Palestinians with c. 75,000 jobs. As CEO of the PIF, Mustafa led the establishment of several leading Palestinian companies including Wataniya Mobile, Amaar Real Estate Investment Company, Al Reehan Real Estate Investment Company, Palestine Power Generation Company, Khazanah Asset Management Company, and Sharakat Fund for Small businesses.

As deputy prime minister, amongst other responsibilities, Mustafa was appointed head of Reconstruction of Gaza following the 2014 Gaza War.

Prior to joining the PIF, Mustafa worked with leading international organizations across global markets. During his time with the World Bank Group, Mustafa held several senior positions across sectors including economic development and reform, project finance, private sector development, telecommunications privatization, and infrastructure development. During his tenure at the World Bank, Mustafa took a sabbatical to work as the founding chief executive officer of PalTel.

Early life and education
Mustafa was born on 26 August 1954 in Kafr Sur, West Bank. As a child, his family was uprooted from their home in the West Bank and took refuge in Kuwait. Mustafa went on to earn a bachelor's degree from Baghdad University in electrical engineering, and a master's degree and Ph.D. from The George Washington University. Mustafa is married and has two children.

References

Living people
1954 births
People named in the Panama Papers
Government ministers of the State of Palestine
People from Tulkarm Governorate